The dark triad is a psychological theory of personality, first published by Delroy L. Paulhus and Kevin M. Williams in 2002, that describes three notably offensive, but non-pathological personality types: Machiavellianism, sub-clinical narcissism, and sub-clinical psychopathy. Each of these personality types is called dark because each is considered to contain malevolent qualities.

All three dark triad traits are conceptually distinct although empirical evidence shows them to be overlapping. They are associated with a callous–manipulative interpersonal style.
 Narcissism is characterized by grandiosity, pride, egotism, and a lack of empathy.
 Machiavellianism is characterized by manipulation and exploitation of others, an absence of morality, lack of emotion, and a higher level of self-interest.
 Psychopathy is characterized by continuous antisocial behavior, impulsivity, selfishness, callous and unemotional traits (CU), and remorselessness.

High scores in these traits have been found to statistically increase a person's likelihood to commit crimes, cause social distress, and create severe problems for organizations, especially if they are in leadership positions. They also tend to be less compassionate, agreeable, empathetic, and satisfied with their lives, and less likely to believe they and others are good.

A factor analysis found that among the big five personality traits, low agreeableness is the strongest correlate of the dark triad, while neuroticism and a lack of conscientiousness were associated with some of the dark triad members. Agreeableness and the dark triad show correlated change over development.

History

In 1998, McHoskey, Worzel, and Szyarto provoked a controversy by claiming that narcissism, Machiavellianism, and psychopathy are more or less interchangeable in normal samples. Delroy L. Paulhus and McHoskey debated these perspectives at a subsequent American Psychological Association conference, inspiring a body of research that continues to grow in the published literature. Paulhus and Williams found enough behavioral, personality, and cognitive differences between the traits to suggest that they were distinct constructs; however, they concluded that further research was needed to elucidate how and why they overlap.

Recent developments
There has recently grown some controversy regarding the nature of the dark triad constructs. Comprehensive measures of the traits reveal that the large majority of their traits are shared, with very few distinguishing features. Factor analyses conducted using these scales also fail to return a three-factor solution (psychopathy, narcissism and Machiavellianism), and instead return a four-factor, trait-based solution:

Antagonism: callousness, emotional coldness, arrogance, manipulativeness and exploitativeness, egocentricity, cynicism and anger.

Agency: defined by dominance, self-assurance, achievement-striving, grandiose fantasies and competency.

Impulsivity: disinhibitory features like rashness, thrill-seeking, irresponsibility, disorganization and oppositionality.

Emotional Stability: low anxiety, fearlessness, indifference to criticism or rebuke, and general contentment.

This findings suggest that psychopathy, narcissism and Machiavellianism may not be distinct traits but rather differing expressions of the same underlying antagonistic core.

Components
The dark triad traits have significant theoretical and empirical overlap. All three traits share characteristics such as a lack of empathy, interpersonal hostility, and interpersonal offensiveness.

A number of measures have been developed to measure all three dark triad traits simultaneously, such as the Dirty Dozen and the Short Dark Triad (SD3). Most of these measures are questionnaire-style and either self-response or observer-response (e.g., ratings from supervisors or coworkers). Both methods can prove problematic when attempting to measure any socially-aversive trait. Self-responders may be motivated to lie, and with observer responses—particularly for Machiavellianism—individuals who are skilled at deceiving and manipulating others should be perceived as low in deceptiveness and manipulation by others, resulting in inaccurate ratings.

Despite these challenges and the acknowledged commonalities among the dark triad traits, there is evidence that the three traits are distinct.

Narcissism
Individuals who score high on narcissism display grandiosity, entitlement, dominance, and superiority. Narcissism has been found to correlate positively with extraversion and openness and negatively with agreeableness. Narcissism has also been found to have a significant correlation with psychopathy.

Assessment of narcissism required clinical interviews until the popular Narcissistic Personality Inventory was created by Raskin and Hall in 1979. Since the NPI, several other measures have emerged which attempt to provide self-report alternatives for personality disorder assessment. In addition, new instruments have been developed to study pathological narcissism as opposed to grandiose narcissism, which is what many argue the NPI measures.

Machiavellianism
People who score high on this trait, named after the political philosophy of Niccolò Machiavelli, are callous, lack morality, and are excessively motivated by self-interest. They view interpersonal manipulation as the key for life success, and behave accordingly. Individuals who are measured to have a high level of Machiavellianism tend to have low agreeableness and conscientiousness. 

The original published version of the Mach-IV is the most widely used measure in empirical research.
While some psychologists argue that Machiavellianism seems to be indistinguishable from psychopathy and that scales of Machiavellianism seem to measure the psychopathy construct, there is enough to suggest that they are two separate traits, as Paulhus notes that psychopaths are impulsive and careless, which makes them different from High Machs who are calculating and plan for the long term.

Psychopathy
Psychopathy is considered the most malevolent of the dark triad. Individuals who score high on psychopathy show low levels of empathy and high levels of impulsivity and thrill-seeking. With respect to the Big Five personality factors, psychopathy has been found to correlate negatively with agreeableness and conscientiousness.

Robert Hare revolutionized the study of psychopathy with his Psychopathy Checklist (PCL), and its revision (PCL-R). Hare noted that asking psychopaths to self-report on psychologically important matters does not necessarily provide accurate or unbiased data. However, efforts have been made to study psychopathy in the dimensional realm using self-reported instruments, as with the Levenson Primary and Secondary Psychopathy Scales, The Psychopathic Personality Inventory, and the Self-Report Psychopathy Scale.

Other forms
Other groupings of dark personality traits have been proposed.

Dark tetrad
Several researchers have suggested expanding the dark triad to contain a fourth dark trait: sadism. It is defined as the enjoyment of cruelty, and is the most common addition. While sadism is highly correlated with the dark triad, researchers have shown that sadism predicts anti-social behavior beyond the dark triad. Sadism shares common characteristics with psychopathy and antisocial behavior (lack of empathy, readiness for emotional involvement, inflicting suffering), although Reidy et al. (2011) showed that sadism distinctively predicted unprovoked aggression separate from psychopathy.

Furthermore, sadism predicted delinquent behavior separately from the other dark triad traits when evaluating high school students.

Harmful behavior against living creatures, brutal and destructive amoral dispositions, and criminal recidivism were additionally more prominently predicted by sadism than psychopathic traits.

Studies on how sadists gain pleasure from cruelty to subjects were applied towards testing people who possessed dark triad traits. Results showed that only people exhibiting traits of sadism derived a sense of pleasure from acts of cruelty, concluding that sadism encompasses distinctly cruel traits not covered by the rest of the dark triad, therefore deserving of its position within the dark tetrad.

Vulnerable dark triad
The vulnerable dark triad comprises three related and similar constructs: vulnerable narcissism, sociopathy, and borderline personality disorder. A study found that these three constructs are significantly related to one another and manifest similar nomological networks. Although the vulnerable dark triad members are related to negative emotionality and antagonistic interpersonal styles, they are also related to introversion and disinhibition; however, these findings are based largely on the reports of parents of white undergraduate students rather than information gleaned from clinical evaluation.

Psychiatric disorders
In general, clinicians view narcissism and psychopathy as pathological. Given the dimensional model of narcissism and psychopathy, these traits are present at the subclinical level, which is a less severe form of clinical narcissism and psychopathy. People with subclinical traits can be identified using self-report assessments that are appropriate for the general population. In the general population, the prevalence rates for sub-clinical and clinical psychopathy are estimated at 1% and 0.2%, respectively.

Machiavellianism has never been referenced in any version of the Diagnostic and Statistical Manual of Mental Disorders. It has been treated as strictly a personality construct. A study from 2016 notes that Machiavellianism seems to be indistinguishable from psychopathy and that scales of Machiavellianism seem to measure the psychopathy construct.

Behaviours

In the workplace

Oliver James identifies each of the three dark triadic personality traits as typically being prevalent in the workplace. Furnham (2010) has identified that the dark triad is related to the acquisition of leadership positions and interpersonal influence. In a meta-analysis of dark triad and workplace outcomes, Jonason and colleagues (2012) found that each of the dark triad traits were related to manipulation in the workplace, but each via unique mechanisms. Specifically, Machiavellianism was related with the use of excessive charm in manipulation, narcissism was related with the use of physical appearance, and psychopathy was related with physical threats. Jonason and colleagues also found that the dark triad traits fully mediated the relationship between gender and workplace manipulation. The dark triad traits have also been found to be fairly well-represented in upper-level management and CEOs.

Internet trolls
Recent studies have found that people who are identified as internet trolls tend to have dark personality traits and show signs of sadism, antisocial behavior, psychopathy, and Machiavellianism. The 2013 case study suggested that there are a number of similarities between anti-social and flame trolling activities, and the 2014 survey indicated that trolling is a manifestation of everyday sadism. Both studies suggest that this trolling may be linked to bullying in both adolescents and adults. A 2021 study found that the dark triad's influence may be mediated by malicious motives, and that there is no strong connection between having these traits and engaging in trolling.

Crime
Youth who score higher in dark triad traits show higher amounts of violent delinquency, specifically with interpersonal violence. Individuals with low self control and dark triad traits showed more overall delinquency, however higher self control lowered the delinquency.  Another study found that those who have admitted to stealing at some point in their life score higher on Machiavellianism and primary and secondary psychopathy. Those higher in psychopathy and Machiavellianism were shown to predict psychological abuse with intimate partner violence, however agreeableness was found to be the main factor.

Cyber crime
There is a clear distinction in the methods of a cyber attack between each part of the dark triad. Psychopathy correlated with faster speeds of persistence and exploitation, Narcissism correlated with faster privilege escalation, persistence, and extraction, and Machiavellianism correlated with stealth. Individuals with higher levels of psychopathy are more likely to engage in cyber bullying, with some correlation to both narcissism and Machiavellianism. Individuals with dark triad traits were also found to be more likely to commit acts of online fraud, with each trait having different impacts on factors. Machiavellianism has impacts on opportunity and motivation, psychopathy has impacts on rationalization, and narcissism has impacts on perceptions of motivation and capabilities.

Ideology
Dark triad characteristics correlate with support for various extremist ideologies. Support for the alt-right, which is prolifically associated with online trolling and harassment, and politically correct authoritarianism both correlate with all three traits as well as measures of entitlement . To a lesser extent, support for a more liberal form of political correctness correlates negatively with psychopathy. Dark triad characteristics correlate positively with out-group threat perceptions, anti-immigrant prejudice, and social dominance orientation, a psychological disposition toward group-based supremacy. Costello et al (2022) found that left- and right-wing authoritarianism correlate similarly with psychopathy.

Origins

Genetics and environment
In a similar manner to research on the Big Five personality traits, twin studies have been conducted in an effort to understand the relative contributions of genetic and environmental factors in the development of dark triad traits.

All three traits of the dark triad have been found to have substantial genetic components. It has also been found that the observed relationships between the three traits, and with the Big Five, are strongly driven by individual differences in genes. Within the triad, psychopathy and narcissism have both been found to be more inheritable than Machiavellianism.

Environmental factors contribute to the development of dark triad traits, although they have less influence than genetics. During childhood and adolescence, environmental factors that are not shared with siblings (such as friends or extracurricular activities) contribute to all three dark triad traits. However, only Machiavellianism is related to environmental factors that are shared with siblings.

Some researchers have interpreted these findings to mean that, of the three, Machiavellianism is the trait most likely to be influenced by the environment.

Evolution

Evolutionary theory may also explain the development of dark triad traits. Despite the relationship of these traits with clinical disorders, some argue that adaptive qualities may accompany the maladaptive ones; their frequency in the gene pool requires at least some local adaptation. The everyday versions of these traits appear in student and community samples, where even high levels can be observed among individuals who manage to get along in daily life. Even in these samples, research indicates correlations with aggression, racism, and bullying among other forms of social aversiveness.

It has been argued that evolutionary behavior predicts not only the development of dark triad personalities, but also the flourishing of such personalities. Indeed, it has been found that individuals demonstrating dark triad personality can be highly successful in society. However, this success is typically short-lived. The main evolutionary argument behind the dark triad traits emphasizes mating strategies. This argument is based on life history theory, which proposes that individuals differ in reproductive strategies; an emphasis on mating is termed a "fast life" strategy, while an emphasis on parenting is termed a "slow reproductive" strategy. There is some evidence that the dark triad traits are related to fast life history strategies; however, there have been some mixed results, and not all three dark triad traits have been related to this strategy. A more detailed approach has attempted to account for some of these mixed results by analyzing the traits at a finer level of detail. These researchers found that while some components of the dark triad are related to a fast life strategy, other components are related to slow reproductive strategies.

Accelerated mating strategy
Studies have suggested that, on average, those who exhibit the dark triad of personality traits have an accelerated mating strategy, reporting more sex partners, more favorable attitudes towards casual sex, lowered standards in their short-term mates, a tendency to steal or poach mates from others, more risk-taking in the form of substance abuse, a tendency to prefer immediate but smaller amounts of money over delayed but larger amounts of money, limited self-control and greater incidence of ADHD symptoms, and a pragmatic and game-playing romance style. These traits have been identified as part of a fast life strategy that appears to be enacted by an exploitative, opportunistic, and protean approach to life in general and at work.

The evidence is mixed regarding the exact link between the dark triad and reproductive success. For example, there is a lack of empirical evidence for reproductive success in the case of psychopathy. Additionally, these traits are not universally short-term-oriented nor are they all impulsive. Furthermore, much of the research reported pertaining to the dark triad cited in the above paragraph is based on statistical procedures that assume the dark triad is a single construct, in spite of genetic and meta-analytic evidence to the contrary.

Physical attractiveness
Several academic studies have found evidence that people with dark triad personalities are judged as slightly better-looking than average on first sight. Two studies have determined that this is because people with dark triad traits put more effort into their appearance, and the difference in attractiveness disappears when "dressed down" with bland clothing and without makeup. Two more studies found that only narcissistic subjects were judged to be better-looking, but the other dark triad traits of Machiavellianism and psychopathy had no correlation with looks. Facial features associated with dark triad traits tend to be rated as less attractive.

Group differences

Gender
The most pronounced group difference is in gender: numerous studies have shown that men tend to score higher than women on narcissism, Machiavellianism, and psychopathy, although the magnitude of the difference varies across traits, the measurement instruments, and the age of the participants. One interesting finding related to narcissism—albeit one based on non-representative samples—is that while men continue to score higher than women, it seems that the gender gap has shrunk considerably when comparing cohort data from 1992 and 2006. More specifically, the aforementioned findings indicate that there has been a general increase in levels of narcissism over time among college students of both sexes, but comparatively, the average level of narcissism in women has increased more than the average level of narcissism in men.

Race
There is far less information available on race differences in dark triad traits, and the data that is available is not representative of the population at-large. For instance, a 2008 research study using undergraduate participants found that Caucasians reported higher levels of narcissism relative to Asians. Similarly, another 2008 study using undergraduate participants found that Caucasians tended to score slightly higher than non-Caucasians on Machiavellianism. When attempting to discern whether there are ethnic differences in psychopathy, researchers have addressed the issue using different measurement instruments (e.g., the Self-Report Psychopathy Scale and The Psychopathic Personality Inventory), but no race differences have been found regardless of the measure used. Additionally, when comparing Caucasians and African Americans from correctional, substance abuse, and psychiatric samples—groups with typically high prevalence rates of psychopathy—researchers again failed to find any meaningful group differences in psychopathy. However, in controversial research conducted by Richard Lynn, a substantial racial difference in psychopathy was found. Lynn proposes "that there are racial and ethnic differences in psychopathic personality conceptualised as a continuously distributed trait, such that high values of the trait are present in blacks and Native Americans, intermediate values in Hispanics, lower values in whites and the lowest values in East Asians." However this research has been heavily criticized for not distinguishing between psychopathy and other anti-social behaviors, confusing between personality and behavioral concepts of psychopathy and presuming rather than demonstrating genetic or evolutionary causes for supposed disparities.

"Generation Me"
The focal variable when analyzing generational or cohort differences in dark triad traits has tended to be narcissism, arising from the hypothesis that so-called "Generation Me" or "Generation Entitlement" would exhibit higher levels of narcissism than previous generations. Indeed, based on analyses of responses to the Narcissistic Personality Inventory collected from over 16,000 U.S. undergraduate students between 1979 and 2006, it was concluded that average levels of narcissism had increased over time. Similar results were obtained in a follow-up study that analyzed the changes within each college campus.  However, a 2017 study found little evidence of strong or widespread cohort-linked changes in disposition or behavioral strategies, although they did find some indications that the current generation is more cynical and less trusting.

An alternative perspective explored group differences in the dark triad and how they relate to positive emotion. Applying structural equation modeling and Latent Profile Analysis, a type of mixture model, to establish patterns in UK, US, and Canadian students, four groups were found: "unhappy but not narcissistic", "vulnerable narcissism", "happy non-narcissism" and "grandiose narcissism". Some extrapolations on how a person might deal with these groups of individuals in practice have been suggested.

Relationship to other personality models

Big Five
The five factor model of personality has significant relationships with the dark triad combined and with each of the dark triad's traits. The dark triad overall is negatively related to both agreeableness and conscientiousness. More specifically, Machiavellianism captures a suspicious versus trusting view of human nature which is also captured by the Trust sub-scale on the agreeableness trait. Extraversion captures similar aspects of assertiveness, dominance, and self-importance as narcissism. Narcissism also is positively related to the achievement striving and competence aspects of Conscientiousness. Psychopathy has the strongest correlations with low dutifulness and deliberation aspects of Conscientiousness.

Honesty–humility
The honesty–humility factor from the HEXACO model of personality is used to measure sincerity, fairness, greed avoidance, and modesty. Honesty–Humility has been found to be strongly negatively correlated to the dark triad traits. Likewise, all three dark triad traits are strongly negatively correlated with Honesty–Humility. The conceptual overlap of the three traits which represents a tendency to manipulate and exploit others for personal gain defines the negative pole of the honesty–humility factor. Typically, any positive effects from the Dark Triad and low Honesty–Humility occur at the individual level, that is, any benefits are conferred onto the one with the traits (e.g., successful mating, obtainment of leadership positions) and not onto others or society at large.

Light triad
Influenced by the dark triad, Scott Barry Kaufman proposed a light triad of personality traits: humanism, Kantianism, and faith in humanity. High scorers on humanism are more likely to value others' dignity and self worth. High scorers on Kantianism are more likely to see others as people, not as a means to an end. High scorers for faith in humanity are more likely to believe others are fundamentally good. When comparing individuals who take both dark triad and light triad tests, the average person was more likely to exhibit light triad traits. This test is not an inversion of dark triad tests, as Kaufman instead focused on developing characteristics that were conceptually opposite from the dark triad. A reliable measure of the light triad traits was developed, and demonstrated that they are not simply the opposite of the dark triad's Big Five and HEXACO model traits. The light triad predicts positive and negative outcomes regarding Agreeableness and Honesty-Humility personality traits, and expands on understanding the dark triad as a useful contrasting analog.

Individuals who score high on light triad traits also report higher levels of religiosity, spirituality, life satisfaction, acceptance of others, belief that they and others are good, compassion, empathy, self-esteem, authenticity, sense of self, positive enthusiasm, having a quiet ego, openness to experience, and conscientiousness. Additionally, those who score higher on the light triad scale are intellectually curious, secure in their attachments to others, and more tolerant to other perspectives. These individuals typically have less motives for achievement and self-enhancement (even though the light triad was positively related to productivity and competence). In contrast to the character strengths of the dark triad, the light triad was uncorrelated with bravery or assertiveness. Lack of such characteristics may be problematic for individuals attempting to reach more challenging goals and fully self-actualizing.

Atlas of Personality, Emotion and Behaviour
The Atlas of Personality, Emotion and Behaviour is a catalogue of 20,500 words descriptive of personality, emotion and behaviour. The words in the catalogue were scored according to a two dimensional matrix taxonomy with orthogonal dimensions of affiliation and dominance. Adjectives representing the behavioural patterns described by the Dark Triad were scored according to the atlas and visualised using kernel density plots in two dimensions.  The atlas clearly delineates the three components of the Dark Triad,  narcissism (green), Machiavellianism (blue), and psychopathy (red).

See also
 Evil
 Macdonald triad
 Malignant narcissism
 Dark Factor of Personality

References

Further reading
 
 
 
 
Machiavellianism, Cognition, and Emotion Psych Central

 
Personality disorders
Personality traits
Abnormal psychology
Clinical psychology
Industrial and organizational psychology
Moral psychology
Psychological manipulation
3 (number)